Manx Telecom Ltd. is the primary provider of broadband and telecommunications on the Isle of Man. It is owned by Basalt Infrastructure Partners LLP.

History 

Historically, the telephone system in the Isle of Man had been run as a monopoly by the British General Post Office, and later British Telecommunications, and operated as part of the Liverpool telephone district.

In 1985, the Manx Government announced that it would award a 20-year licence to operate the telephone system in a tender process. As part of this process, in 1986 British Telecom created a Manx-registered subsidiary company, Manx Telecom, to bid for the tender. It was believed that a local identity and management would be more politically acceptable in the tendering process as they competed with Cable & Wireless to win the licence.

Manx Telecom won the tender, and commenced operations under the new identity from 1 January 1987.

On 17 November 2001, Manx Telecom became part of mmO2 following the demerger of BT Wireless's operations from BT Group.

On 4 June 2010 Manx Telecom was sold to UK private equity investor HgCapital (who were buying the majority stake), alongside telecoms management company CPS Partners. HG Capital indicated that the enterprise value of the deal was £158.8 million ($232.5 million).

In 2014 it floated on the AIM market.

On 9 May 2019 private equity investor Basalt Investment Partners completed their acquisition of Manx Telecom.

Operations 

Manx Telecom operates fixed line and mobile networks, and data centres on the Isle of Man.  The Global Solutions division operates outside of the Isle of Man through mobile virtual network operator (MVNO) and international roaming agreements.

The mobile phone network operated by Manx Telecom had been used by O2 as an environment for developing and testing new products and services prior to wider rollout. In December 2001, the company became the first telecommunications operator in Europe to launch a live 3G network.  In November 2005, the company became the first in Europe to offer its customers an HSDPA (3.5G) service.

Principal competitors
 Sure
 Wi-Manx
 Domicilium
 BlueWave Communications

See also
 Communications Commission
 Communications on the Isle of Man
 Manx Telecomputer Bus

References

External links
 
 Telefonica Sells Manx Telecom to Private Equity Groups
 Manx Telecom Stronger With New Owners Says CEO

Communications in the Isle of Man
Companies of the Isle of Man